Local elections were held in Laikipia County on 4 March 2013. Under the new constitution, which was passed in a 2010 referendum, the 2013 general election was to be the first where there would be election of county governors and their deputies for the 47 newly created counties. They were also the first general elections run by the Independent Electoral and Boundaries Commission(IEBC) which released the official list of candidates.

Gubernatorial election

Prospective candidates
The following are some of the candidates who made public their intentions to run: 
 Mwangi Kiunjuri - MP for Laikipia East Constituency and assistant minister for Public Works 
 Nderitu Mureithi - MP for Laikipia West Constituency and assistant minister for Industrialisation
 Joshua Irungu - a community development specialist 
 Mburu Kamau - Businessman

References

 

2013 local elections in Kenya
Laikipia County